Agnieszka Kołakowska (born 1960) is a Polish philosopher, philologist, translator and essayist.

She is the recipient of the 2012  for the essay collection Wojny kultur i inne wojny.

She was born in 1960 to the family of philosopher Leszek Kołakowski and Tamara Dynenson. She defines herself as a Jew, as her mother is a Polish Jew.

Books
2010: Wojny kultur i inne wojny (Wars of Cultures and Other Wars, essay collection),  
2016: Plaga słowików (Plague of Nightingales, essay collection),

References

1960 births
Living people
Jewish philosophers
Polish philologists
Polish translators
21st-century Polish writers
20th-century Polish Jews
21st-century Polish Jews
21st-century Polish philosophers
Polish women philosophers